Elk Lakes Provincial Park is a provincial park in southeastern British Columbia, Canada, located west of the continental divide (the British Columbia/Alberta border). It is located adjacent to Height of the Rockies Provincial Park and is about 104 kilometers north of Sparwood. The park features sub-alpine landscapes, remnant glaciers, rugged peaks and productive lakes. Much of the park is above treeline and features several prominent mountains including Mount Fox, Mount Aosta, Mount McCuaig, and Mount Elkan. The Petain, Castelnau, Nivelle, and Elk Glaciers lie on the northeastern edge of the park. The following lakes are also present inside park boundaries: Upper and Lower Elk Lake, Frozen Lake, Fox Lake, Cadorna Lake, and Abruzzi Lake.
Below the treeline, the park features mature growth forests of alpine fir, Engelmann spruce, and lodgepole pine. These trees are also intermingled with juniper, twinberry, false azalea, white rhododendron, and buffalo berry. The wildlife of the area includes Beaver, Snowshoe Hare, Red Squirrel, white-tailed deer, moose, and many varieties of birds.

See also
Continental Ranges

References

External links

Provincial parks of British Columbia
Parks in the Regional District of East Kootenay
Elk Valley (British Columbia)
1995 establishments in British Columbia
Protected areas established in 1995